Birthday is the second and final single from Taproot's third album, Blue-Sky Research. The song is the band's last to be released through Atlantic Records following poor album sales. "Birthday" was co-written by music producer Bob Marlette.

Track listing

The radio edit of the song omits the heavy section of the bridge and the screamed vocals.

Chart positions

Personnel
 Mike DeWolf – guitar
 Philip Lipscomb – bass
 Jarrod Montague – drums
 Stephen Richards – vocals, guitar

References

2005 songs
2005 singles
Songs about birthdays
Taproot (band) songs
Atlantic Records singles
Songs written by Bob Marlette
Songs written by Stephen Richards (musician)